Adriano Duarte Castanheira (born 7 April 1993) is a Portuguese professional footballer who plays for F.C. Penafiel on loan from F.C. Paços de Ferreira as a winger.

Club career
Born in Neuchâtel, Switzerland to Portuguese parents, Castanheira finished his youth career with FC Porto. He spent the better part of his first four seasons as a senior with S.C. Covilhã of the Segunda Liga, making his debut in the competition on 26 August 2012 in a 0–1 home loss against F.C. Penafiel where he came on as a late substitute.

Ahead of the 2016–17 campaign, Castanheira returned to the third division and Sport Benfica e Castelo Branco, whom he had already represented on loan. In the summer of 2017, he signed with U.D. Leiria of the same league.

On 8 June 2018, Castanheira re-joined Covilhã. He scored seven goals in 34 matches in the first year in his second spell, helping to a final sixth position in the second tier.

Castanheira agreed to a two-and-a-half-year contract with F.C. Paços de Ferreira on 19 December 2019. His maiden appearance in the Primeira Liga took place on 5 January 2020, when he played the entire 1–0 home victory over Moreirense FC. His first goal came on 1 March, when he netted from a penalty kick to close the 3–1 away defeat of bottom-placed C.D. Aves.

On 11 August 2021, Castanheira was loaned to second-division club G.D. Chaves.

References

External links

1993 births
Living people
People from Neuchâtel
Swiss people of Portuguese descent
Portuguese footballers
Association football wingers
Primeira Liga players
Liga Portugal 2 players
Campeonato de Portugal (league) players
S.C. Covilhã players
Sport Benfica e Castelo Branco players
U.D. Leiria players
F.C. Paços de Ferreira players
G.D. Chaves players
F.C. Penafiel players